The Hong Kong Applied Science and Technology Research Institute Company Limited (ASTRI) was established by the Hong Kong Special Administrative Region Government in 2000 as an R&D centre for information and communications technologies. The Institute states its objective as 'enhancing Hong Kong’s competitiveness in technology-based industries through applied research'.

ASTRI focuses on applied research by pursuing R&D projects in partnership with public sector bodies or private sector businesses. Over the years, it has built a portfolio of intellectual properties while developing applications for various industries and sectors. Since 2000, ASTRI has completed over 500 research projects and been granted around 900 patents in the US, Mainland China and other territories. It has transferred over 750 technologies to industries.

ASTRI focuses on five areas of applications: smart city, financial technologies, intelligent manufacturing, digital health, and Application Specific Integrated Circuits through ASTRI's role as the Hong Kong branch of the Chinese National Engineering Research Centre (CNERC).

Over 600 people currently work for ASTRI based in its facility in Hong Kong Science Park.

Board of directors
ASTRI is headed by the Chief Executive Officer and is governed by a board of directors from the business and academic worlds of Hong Kong and Hong Kong SAR government representatives. The Board of Directors has established three functional committees, namely the Finance and Administration Committee, the Science and Technology Committee and the Audit Committee to assist the Board of Directors in governing the Academy.

The current Chairman of the board is Ir Sunny Lee Wai-kwong, JP. The Permanent Secretary for Innovation and Technology and the Commissioner for Innovation and Technology represent the Hong Kong Government in the Board.

Senior executives
Chief Executive Officer: Dr Denis Yip
Chief Technology Officer: Dr Lucas Hui
Chief Operating Officer: Mr David Chan
Chief Financial Officer: Ms. Cammy Yung
Chief Administration Officer: Mr Aaron Ho

Key research areas
ASTRI's core R&D competence in various areas is organized under five Technology Divisions, namely Artificial Intelligence & Big Data; Communications; Cybersecurity, Cryptography & Trusted Technologies; Integrated Circuits & Systems; and Internet of Things & Sensors.

Joint initiatives
ASTRI has established multiple joint R&D laboratories to collaborate with other businesses and institutions. Its major joint initiatives include:

Hong Kong branch of the Chinese National Engineering Research Centre (CNERC) for Application Specific Integrated Circuits

ASTRI Cyber Range in partnership with Hong Kong Police Force

ASTRI Cybersecurity Lab in partnership with Hong Kong Monetary Authority and Hong Kong Institute of Bankers

ASTRI-Hong Kong International Airport Smart Airport Joint R&D Center

HKMA-ASTRI FinTech Innovation Hub

Bank of China (Hong Kong) - ASTRI Joint Innovation Center for Finance and Technology

HSBC - ASTRI Joint Innovation Lab

ICBC - ASTRI Joint Innovation Lab

Functions 

The Hong Kong Applied Science and Technology Research Institute is currently Hong Kong’s Information and Communications Technologies (ICT) R&D Centre, under which it operates in four technology areas, namely Consumer Electronics, Communications Technologies, IC Design and Optoelectronics.  It collaborates with local universities to nurture young talents and entrepreneurs in the I&T and fintech industry, providing Hong Kong and the whole region with greater momentum to become an international I&T hub and strengthening Hong Kong’s status as an international financial center.  ASTRI has expanded its I&T footprint in the Greater Bay Area (GBA) as well, by providing incentives (such as scholarships) for local, Mainland Chinese and overseas STEM talents, collaborating with universities and research institutes in the GBA, and encouraging technology transfer via Government-Industry-University-Research cooperation. 

On a broader level, ASTRI aims at becoming a world-class technology developer and bolstering Hong Kong’s competitiveness through applied research and innovation. Its core values are innovation, accountability, respect, service and tenacity. More tangibly, its technology transfers have generated over HK$450 million for commercial industry and it has filed more than 1286 patents, with 900 having been granted. These services are supported by the 500 R&D professionals who work at ASTRI, with 26% holding doctorates and more than 53% holding Master’s degrees.

Progress in key research areas 

Under ASTRI’s four technology divisions are 5 core areas of applied scientific and technological research, namely, smart city, financial technologies, intelligent manufacturing, digital health, application specific integrated circuits and metaverse.  They have joint laboratories and research facilities with local and Mainland Chinese educational institutions, private companies and public agencies. 

Smart city

ASTRI has collaborated with both public and private bodies to achieve its goals in developing Hong Kong into a smart city. In 2016, it set up a joint research center with the Airport Authority to accelerate the use of wireless communications and artificial intelligence in Hong Kong International Airport.   In 2018, ASTRI announced the launch of the ASTRI-Hong Kong Telecom (HKT) Smart City Joint Laboratory, which aims at developing technologies that facilitate deployment of artificial intelligence, 5G networks, blockchain and big data analytics to address urban challenges and improve public services.  It has made progress in areas such as smart mobility by utilizing 5G applications to boost the autonomous vehicle experience and the development of intelligent transport systems in Hong Kong.  In addition, ASTRI’s research in areas such as machine learning techniques, cryptography and cybersecurity has also helped streamline currency and payment systems and health record management.  In 2019, ASTRI’s Intelligent Sensing Technology System team made breakthroughs in the fields of optoelectronics and sensing technologies by developing tools for automated inspection, spatial light modulators, optical beam steering modules, etc.  Its smart city initiative also complements Hong Kong’s environmental and social sustainability through the development of energy conservation systems and integrated intelligent intervention learning systems for SEN students.  

Financial technologies

In terms of financial technology research, ASTRI launched the Cybersecurity Fortification Initiative with the Hong Kong Monetary Authority in 2016, which led to the establishment of a cyber resilience framework and cyber intelligence sharing platform.  In 2017, it launched the HSBC-ASTRI Research and Development Innovation Laboratory with HSBC, an initiative that has conducted research on block-chain based property valuation, trade finance, Chinese handwriting optical character recognition and digital-ID prototype.  Similarly, it has developed a property purchasing platform using blockchain technology by collaborating with New World Development Company Limited, with Bank of China Hong Kong being the first corporate participant.  Moreover, it has developed a smart investment platform with t.Axiom which provides investors with analyzed empirical market data based on users’ behavioral attributes.  On its own, it has designed a credit-scoring framework for micro, small and medium-sized enterprises in Hong Kong to access funds by providing banks with their business information and documentation.  ASTRI aims at collaborating with its counterparts in the GBA as well to further its research efforts in financial technology. 

Intelligent manufacturing

In 2015, ASTRI partnered with Truly Opto-Electrics Ltd for the commercialization of LCD screen research.  In 2016, they won the “Hong Kong Awards for Industries” in the equipment and machinery design category for their “Cover Glass and Touch Panel Glass Automatic Defects Inspection System”, an intelligent inspection system that provides machine vision solutions for applications or devices that use cover glass and touch panel glass.   ASTRI’s research in other areas of intelligent manufacturing, such as in wireless power transfer techniques and advanced power electronics technologies, are aimed towards the broad goals of re-industrialization in the Greater Bay Area. 

Digital health

ASTRI has made progress in the field of biomedical imaging, with its non-invasive health screening devices being used in hospitals and medical centres in Hong Kong.  In 2022, it won the silver award in the International Exhibition of Inventions of Geneva for its preventive eye retina checking solution for seniors- a home AI-enabled scanning system that traces users’ retina movements to detect preventable diseases.  

Application Specific Integration Circuits

ASTRI focuses on microelectronics and integrated circuits research, and is leading research efforts in third-generation semiconductors.   Ongoing research projects include hardware accelerated 3D conversion systems, narrowband internet of things, Bluetooth low energy solutions and visually enhanced ultra high definition technology.

History 

Building upon the vision espoused by the 1997 Policy Address to establish Hong Kong as an “innovative centre in the region” and to develop a knowledge-based economy, the inception of ASTRI was proposed in 1998 by the Chief Executive’s Commission on Innovation and Technology headed by Prof. Chang-Lin Tien in their attempt to introduce a detailed blueprint for the city’s long-term innovation and technology development in the immediate post-handover period, of which ASTRI was to play a leading role. The aim was to remedy the gap in midstream R&D capability inhibiting industry from “turning innovative ideas or scientific research results into commercial products” – a gap identified to be too wide to be narrowed by solely strengthening the capabilities of universities and industries. 

In their First Report, the Commission proposed ASTRI to perform four key functions, namely (i) conduct midstream R&D on generic and pre-competitive technologies, (ii) house university graduates aspiring to obtain industrial research training, (iii) become a focal point for attracting overseas R&D talent, and (iv) supply technological and human resource capabilities as complements to Hong Kong Science Park. In relation to budgeting and costs, the Commission recommended three sources of funding: recurrent provision from the government, the Innovation and Technology Fund (ITF) also recommended in the Report, and “income from contract research and technology transfer to industry” . 

In their Second and Final Report, the Commission established ASTRI’s role in an overarching institutional framework to coordinate the city’s I&T development involving five broad types of services. ASTRI is to be responsible for (a) R&D support, (b) building up of human capital and (c) technology diffusion and productivity enhancement, with the aid of organizations including but not limited to universities,  Hong Kong Productivity Council, Hong Kong Science Park and the other companies it later merged with to form the Hong Kong Science and Technology Parks Corporation.

The proposal was accepted by the Government, with a Task Force chaired by the Director-General of Industry to flesh out the specifics . Subsequently, in 2001, ASTRI was established as a limited company and subvented organization under the Memoranda of Administrative Arrangements and the ITF, with permanent facilities in Science Park. ASTRI’s original missions in the First Report were further expanded to include acting as (v)  a “spawning ground” for innovation and technology entrepreneurs, and (vi) a focal point for collaboration between industries and universities .  Six research projects were developed and commenced by 2003, encompassing photonics technologies, wireless communications, integrated circuit design, Internet software and biotechnology .

Major developments  

Narrowing Foci and Expanding Outreach: Two Milestones Recognized by the Government 

In 2006, ASTRI was designated by the Innovation and Technology Commission as the R&D Centre for Information and Communications Technologies, a division of labour in select focus areas assigned by the Commission in light of the contemporaneous and spontaneous establishments of the Automotive Platforms and Applications Systems R&D Centre, the Logistics and Supply Chain MultiTech R&D Centre, Nano and Advanced Materials Institute, and the HKRITA. Simply put, ASTRI was no longer the only publicly funded R&D Centre. ASTRI’s foci were to be on companies that commercialize the technologies developed by research institutions, and the process of paid transfer of technology from the research institution to its industry customers for commercialization .

In 2012, ASTRI began to be involved in the national efforts for innovation and technology development. ASTRI was approved by the Ministry of Science and Technology to establish the first Hong Kong Branch of the Chinese National Engineering Research Centre (“CNERC”) for Application Specific Integrated Circuit System. This was a project in collaboration with  Southeast University . 

2007 Audit Commission Review

Problems with ASTRI’s management surfaced in 2007. The Public Accounts Committee identified several major issues, summarized as follows. Firstly, the profitability of projects commissioned was questionable. Secondly, administrative costs had been abnormally high. Some funds had been misappropriated – entertainment expenses exceeded the amount stipulated in the annual budget, with a major incident involving the hiring of Chinese geomancy masters thrice instigating much negative publicity . Thirdly, staff recruitment procedures were identified to be improper, of which some staff received salaries higher than the maximum of designated pay bands. In addition, issues arose with project management. Risk analyses were not conducted, and there existed rampant incompliance with regards to reporting requirements. Finally, ASTRI’s Directors failed to observe standard protocol such as attending meetings and signing non-disclosure agreements, and were unwilling to disclose timely and accurate information on its use of funds despite being requested by the Audit Commission. 

The above issues also signaled the incapability of two government appointed Directors to the Board, namely Permanent Secretary for Commerce, Industry and Technology and the Commissioner of Innovation and Technology, to monitor ASTRI’s governance . Following the report, the CEO of ASTRI resigned after much reluctance. The absence of further government documents addressing the issue made concluding whether or not ASTRI enforced the changes proposed by the Audit Commission, such as ensuring Directors’ completion of interest forms and reconfiguring pay structures to the market rate, infeasible despite verbal affirmation by the Chief Executive . Scandals involving the misappropriation of funds continued to surface after the review , with some involving its top Directors .  However, ASTRI has consistently remained as the R&D Centre with the highest profitability rates in its projects compared with its other publicly funded counterparts .

Organizational structure 

ASTRI is governed by a Board of Directors from the academic, industrial and commercial sectors and the Hong Kong SAR Government. The Board comprises 20 directors including the Chairman, 17 members and 2 official members representing the Government. The current Board Chairman is Ir Sunny Lee Wai-kwong, JP. The current Official Members are Ms Annie Choi Suk-han, JP, the Permanent Secretary for Innovation and Technology and Ms Rebecca Pun Ting-ting, JP, the Commissioner for Innovation and Technology. 

The Board is responsible for designating the policy and strategic directions of ASTRI in carrying out its main functions, which includes decisions related to internal administration, asset management and external relations.  

There are three functional committees under the Board, namely the Finance and Administration Committee, the Technology Committee  and the Audit Committee  to assist the Board in overseeing ASTRI’s research initiatives, finance and administration matters, and the internal and external audit processes respectively.

ASTRI’s overall management is headed by a Chief Executive Officer (CEO), who is responsible to the Board. He is assisted by the Chief Technology Officer, Chief Operating Officer, Chief Financial Officer and Chief Administrative Officer to supervise technology divisions, commercial, marketing, financial, administrative, and other functions. 

ASTRI’s core research & development competence is organized under four Technology Divisions, namely Trust and AI Technologies, Communications Technologies, IoT Sensing and AI Technologies, and Integrated Circuits and Systems. It is applied across six core areas which are Smart City, Financial Technologies, Intelligent Manufacturing, Digital Health, Application Specific Integrated Circuits and Metaverse. 

As of 31 March 2021, ASTRI has 626 staff.

Funding, financing and pay scales  

The formal funding source of ASTRI is the Hong Kong SAR government.   The Finance and Administration Committee, established by the Board of Directors of ASTRI, formally oversees ASTRI’s finance and administration matters. Comprising members from both academia and the industry, the Committee recommends the Annual Budget to the Board for consideration and adoption, monitors the financial performance of ASTRI, and ensures that funds made available to it are properly expended and accounted for - among other tasks.    Information about pay scale is not publicly available, but some anonymous self-reports of salary are found on glassdoor.

In 2022, the government continued to invest heavily in I&T, including setting up a HK$5 billion “Strategic Tech Fund”. Its measures included increasing funding for Hong Kong Branches of Chinese National Engineering Research Centres and State Key Laboratories.  In addition to regular funding by the government, ASTRI also received income from industry annually. It received $107.4 million and $103.5 million in 2019 and 2020 respectively, with its industry income expected to increase to $113 million in 2021.

Relations with HKSTP and Cyberport 

ASTRI has actively collaborated with HKSTP alongside external parties’ involvement in the advancement of particular technologies. Examples include the strategic agreement with Infineon Technologies to advance thermal management solutions, the strategic agreement with China Mobile Hong Kong to support Hong Kong’s smart city development and the Blockchain-focused accelerator programme with Mhub Blockchain Limited for start-ups . 

ASTRI’s expansion to the Greater Bay Area will be headquartered in HKSTP's forthcoming Shenzhen branch in Futian District, focusing on application specific integrated circuits and 5G technology .

ASTRI, HKSTP and Cyberport have also engaged each other to help develop Hong Kong’s innovation and technological community. They launched and participated in joint initiatives such as the “Blockchain Strategies for Business” Conference  and the FinTech Career Accelerator Scheme by the Hong Kong Monetary Authority. In 2022, ASTRI established the FinTech Future Leader Academy and offers internships for undergraduates and postgraduates in the relevant disciplines, which includes field visits to HKSTP and Cyberport as supporting organizations.

Internship aside, joint programs in I&T talent development leveraging the respective foci of I&T quangos appear to be limited. There is little evidence of collaboration between ASTRI, HKSTP InnoAcademy  and Cyberport Academy  in this regard, of which the relevant departments within the three quangos aforementioned appear to host mutually exclusive programs in cultivating and training I&T talent. 

Public comments were made that ASTRI, HKSTP and Cyberport should be merged and listed for financing purposes .

Evaluations and public reception 

Notwithstanding contributions to technological development in Hong Kong, ASTRI has been subject to criticism on several fronts. Earlier problems included financial mismanagement, overpay of staff, and unfairness of recruitment, as an Audit Commission report laid bare in 2006.  Another common perception is the stalemate in its early development. After Donald Tsang rose to the position of CE, he did not thoroughly follow up earlier development with new policies and initiatives. 

The ASTRI is now known for its poorly developed KPIs. Mr. Holden Chow, a legislator of the DAB, commented in 2021 that “the KPIs of the four R&D centers under ASTRI are actually disappointing in monetary terms”. With evidence from figures during 2015 to 2019, he opined that “$1 billion to $2 billion for operation and R&D work, but the revenues from the commercialized products were less than $50 million”. He called for more effective KPIs to be set for ASTRI in the future.  Another legislator Ann Chiang even went further and commented, after a decade-long investment of 10 billion, that “none can be seen” in the impacts of science and technology research on GDP and economic growth. She noted the absence of producers, and of further development of products after the initial stage of invention .

Mr. So Kam-leung, then Secretary for Commerce and Economic Development, likewise admitted earlier in 2011 that the overall cost-effectiveness of the Hong Kong Jockey Club Institute of Chinese Medicine (HKJCICM), a limited company of ASTRI, was not satisfactory either, and its R&D had failed to keep abreast of the latest developments in the Chinese medicine. Some stakeholders had also been discouraged from submitting R&D proposals to the HKJCICM because of different views over some funding conditions imposed by the HKJCICM. 

Public perception corroborated these observations. Experts in the field, for instance, opine that ASTRI has failed to give full play to its functions and achieve the effect of revitalization of industries, and that a staunch collaboration between ASTRI, the industries and universities remains wanting.  Dr. Law Cheung-kwok also pointed to the lack of improvement of its cost-benefit balance over the years. Per an expenditure of HKD$100, he discovered direct commercial revenue of $5. Without a reappraisal of the current performance indicators, accordingly, he expected ASTRI to provide little help to boost the city’s technological development.

References 

Research institutes in Hong Kong
Multidisciplinary research institutes
Scientific organizations
Science and technology studies associations